Editorial Premiere was a Mexican magazine publishing company. The company's magazines focused on niche topics with the goal of informing, entertaining and educating readers.

In December 2010, Editorial Premiere ceased operations and the magazines Cine Premiere and Inversionista were acquired by publisher Impresiones Aéreas SA de CV

Publications
 Cine Premiere
 SWITCH
 Inversionista
 MAX
 FHM Mexico
 Eve

References

External links
  Official Website

Premiere